Robert Llewellyn Clancy  is a retired Australian clinical immunologist in the field of mucosal immunology. He is known for his research and development of therapies for chronic obstructive pulmonary disease (COPD), commonly known as emphysema.

Clancy developed the vaccine Broncostat at the University of Newcastle in 1985.

Clancy is an emeritus professor at the University of Newcastle's School of Biomedical Sciences and Pharmacy. He was previously Foundation Chair of Pathology at the University of Newcastle. Earlier in his career he was the first clinical immunologist at the Royal Prince Alfred Hospital, Sydney. He was educated at North Sydney Boys High School. He holds a BS.Med (Hons) and a MBBS (Hons) from the University of Sydney and a PhD from Monash University. He is a fellow of the Royal Australasian College of Physicians (FRACP) and the Royal College of Pathologists of Australia (FRCPA). He was admitted as a Member of the Order of Australia (AM, Order of Australia) in 2005 for service to cartography as a collector of early maps of Australia and to the field of immunology.

During the COVID-19 pandemic Clancy was involved in controversy when he was quoted by Australian MP Craig Kelly in support of unverified information about claimed benefits of the drugs hydroxychloroquine and ivermectin. Newcastle University issued a statement in which it distanced itself from Clancy's views, mentioning also that the vice-chancellor had said the university did "not consider Robert Clancy a subject matter expert on COVID-19".

See also 
 COVID-19 misinformation
 Ivermectin during the COVID-19 pandemic

References 

1941 births
Living people
Australian immunologists
Members of the Order of Australia
20th-century Australian medical doctors
21st-century Australian medical doctors
People educated at North Sydney Boys High School